"16 Lovin' Ounces to the Pound" is a song co-written and recorded by Don Lee. It was a hit on the US country charts in 1982.

Background
By July 1982, "16 Lovin' Ounces to the Pound" was released on Crescent 103. It was produced by Lee and co-written along with B. Duncan, B. R. Jones and J. R. Halper. Lee had previously made the Cash Box Top 100 Country Singles chart that year with the single, "I'm in Love with a Memory".

Chart performance

Billboard
The single stayed on the Billboard country chart for a total of three weeks, reaching a peak position of 86 on September 18, 1982.

Cash Box
On September 25, 1982, the single had been on the Cash Box Top 100 Country Singles chart for five weeks, moving to No. 66 on the chart.

References

1982 songs
Songs written by Don Lee (musician)